Emilio Benfele Álvarez (born 15 November 1972) is a former professional tennis player from Spain who retired in 2005. His favourite surface was clay, and he achieved his only ATP final in 2000 in Kitzbühel. At the same tournament he reached the semifinals in 1996, he got into Kitzbühel draw after losing in the last round of qualifying and beat specialists at clay: Santoro, Clavet, Medvedev and top seed Muster before losing in three sets to Berasategui in the semifinals. He achieved his career-high singles ranking of world No. 81 in 1997 (and No. 91 in doubles in 2004).

ATP career finals

Singles: 1 (1 runner-up)

Doubles: 2 (2 runner-ups)

Top 10 wins

External links
 
 

1972 births
Living people
People from Figueres
Sportspeople from the Province of Girona
Tennis players from Catalonia
Tennis players from Munich
Spanish expatriate sportspeople in Germany
Spanish male tennis players